East Cliff and Springbourne is a ward in Bournemouth, Dorset. Since 2019, the ward has elected 3 councillors to Bournemouth, Christchurch and Poole Council.

History 
The ward formerly elected 3 councillors to Bournemouth Borough Council. Crime is reported to be high in the ward.

Geography 
The ward covers the suburbs of East Cliff and Springbourne. It mainly has the same borders as under Bournemouth Borough council, but also has parts of what used to be in Queen's Park.

Councillors

Election results

References

External links 

 East Cliff and Springbourne 2011 Census Factsheet
 Listed buildings in the ward

Wards of Bournemouth, Christchurch and Poole